The 2022 season was the Southern Brave's second season of the 100 ball franchise cricket, The Hundred. The team entered the 2022 season having had the best combined season the year before, with the men's side being the reigning champions, and with the women's team finishing as runners-up.

While the women's team performed just as well as the 2021 season, finishing as runners-up for the second continuous season, the men's team struggled finishing in 7th place.

Players

Men's side 
 Bold denotes players with international caps.

Women's side 
 Bold denotes players with international caps.

Group fixtures

Fixtures (Men)

Fixtures (Women)

Due to the shortened women's competition, Southern Brave didn't play against Birmingham Phoenix.

Standings

Women

 advanced to Final
 advanced to the Eliminator

Men

 advanced to Final
 advanced to the Eliminator

Knockout stages

Women

Eliminator

Final

References

The Hundred (cricket)
2022 in English cricket